Christophe Coursimault is a French professional football manager.

Career
Since 2010 until 2012 he coached the New Caledonia national football team.

References

External links
Profile at Soccerway.com
 Christophe Coursimault Interview

Year of birth missing (living people)
Living people
French football managers
New Caledonia national football team managers
Place of birth missing (living people)